Federal Republic of Nigeria – sovereign country located in West Africa.  Nigeria is a federal constitutional republic comprising thirty-six states and one Federal Capital Territory. Nigeria borders the Republic of Benin in the west, Chad and Cameroon in the east, and Niger in the north.  Its coast lies on the Gulf of Guinea, part of the Atlantic Ocean, in the south.  The capital of Nigeria is Abuja.

The people of Nigeria have an extensive history, and archaeological evidence shows that human habitation of the area dates back to at least 9000 BC. The Benue-Cross River area is thought to be the original homeland of the Bantu migrants who spread across most of central and southern Africa in waves between the 1st millennium BC and the 2nd millennium.

Nigeria is the most populous country in Africa and the eighth most populous country in the world with a population of over 140 million. The country is listed among the "Next Eleven" economies, and is one of the fastest growing in the world with the International Monetary Fund projecting growth of 9% in 2008 and 8.3% in 2009.

The following outline is provided as an overview of and topical guide to Nigeria:

General reference 

 Pronunciation: 
 Common English country name:  Nigeria
 Official English country name:  The Federal Republic of Nigeria
 Common endonym(s):  
 Official endonym(s):  
 Adjectival(s): Nigerian
 Demonym(s):
 ISO country codes:  NG, NGA, 566
 ISO region codes:  See ISO 3166-2:NG
 Internet country code top-level domain:  .ng

Geography of Nigeria 

Geography of Nigeria
 Nigeria is: a country
 Population of Nigeria: 148,093,000  - 8th most populous country
 Area of Nigeria: 923,768 km2
 Atlas of Nigeria

Location 
 Nigeria is situated within the following regions:
 Northern Hemisphere and Eastern Hemisphere
 Africa
 West Africa
 Time zone:  West Africa Time (UTC+01)
 Extreme points of Nigeria
 High:  Chappal Waddi 
 Low:  Lagos Island 
 Land boundaries:  4,047 km
 1,690 km
 1,497 km
 773 km
 87 km
 Coastline:  Gulf of Guinea 853 km

Environment of Nigeria 

Environment of Nigeria
 Climate of Nigeria
 Environmental issues in Nigeria
 Ecoregions in Nigeria
 Renewable energy in Nigeria
 Protected areas of Nigeria
 National parks of Nigeria
 Wildlife of Nigeria
 Fauna of Nigeria
 Birds of Nigeria
 Mammals of Nigeria

Natural geographic features of Nigeria 

 Glaciers in Nigeria: none 
 Islands of Nigeria
 Mountains of Nigeria
 Volcanoes in Nigeria
 Rivers of Nigeria
Olumirin Water Falls, Erin Ijesa, Oriade Local Government Area, Osun State.
 World Heritage Sites in Nigeria

Regions of Nigeria 

Regions of Nigeria

Ecoregions of Nigeria 

List of ecoregions in Nigeria
 Ecoregions in Nigeria

Administrative divisions of Nigeria

Municipalities of Nigeria 

 Capital of Nigeria: Abuja and former capital Lagos
 Cities of Nigeria
 Villages of Nigeria

Demography of Nigeria 

Demographics of Nigeria

Government and politics of Nigeria 

Politics of Nigeria
 Form of government: federal presidential representative democratic republic
 Capital of Nigeria: Abuja
 Elections in Nigeria
 Political parties in Nigeria

Branches of the government of Nigeria 

Government of Nigeria

Executive branch of the government of Nigeria 
 Head of state: President of Nigeria,
 Head of government: President of Nigeria
 Cabinet of Nigeria

Legislative branch of the government of Nigeria 

 Parliament of Nigeria (bicameral)
 Upper house: Senate of Nigeria
 Lower house: House of Representatives of Nigeria

Judicial branch of the government of Nigeria 

Court system of Nigeria
 Supreme Court of Nigeria

Foreign relations of Nigeria 

Foreign relations of Nigeria
 Diplomatic missions in Nigeria
 Diplomatic missions of Nigeria

International organization membership 
The Federal Republic of Nigeria is a member of:

 African, Caribbean, and Pacific Group of States (ACP)
 African Development Bank Group (AfDB)
 African Union (AU)
 African Union/United Nations Hybrid operation in Darfur (UNAMID)
 Commonwealth of Nations
 Economic Community of West African States (ECOWAS)
 Food and Agriculture Organization (FAO)
 Group of 15 (G15)
 Group of 24 (G24)
 Group of 77 (G77)
 International Atomic Energy Agency (IAEA)
 International Bank for Reconstruction and Development (IBRD)
 International Chamber of Commerce (ICC)
 International Civil Aviation Organization (ICAO)
 International Criminal Court (ICCt)
 International Criminal Police Organization (Interpol)
 International Development Association (IDA)
 International Federation of Red Cross and Red Crescent Societies (IFRCS)
 International Finance Corporation (IFC)
 International Fund for Agricultural Development (IFAD)
 International Hydrographic Organization (IHO)
 International Labour Organization (ILO)
 International Maritime Organization (IMO)
 International Mobile Satellite Organization (IMSO)
 International Monetary Fund (IMF)
 International Olympic Committee (IOC)
 International Organization for Migration (IOM)
 International Organization for Standardization (ISO)
 International Red Cross and Red Crescent Movement (ICRM)
 International Telecommunication Union (ITU)
 International Telecommunications Satellite Organization (ITSO)

 International Trade Union Confederation (ITUC)
 Inter-Parliamentary Union (IPU)
 Islamic Development Bank (IDB)
 Multilateral Investment Guarantee Agency (MIGA)
 Nonaligned Movement (NAM)
 Organisation of Islamic Cooperation (OIC)
 Organisation for the Prohibition of Chemical Weapons (OPCW)
 Organization of American States (OAS) (observer)
 Organization of Petroleum Exporting Countries (OPEC)
 Permanent Court of Arbitration (PCA)
 United Nations (UN)
 United Nations Conference on Trade and Development (UNCTAD)
 United Nations Educational, Scientific, and Cultural Organization (UNESCO)
 United Nations High Commissioner for Refugees (UNHCR)
 United Nations Industrial Development Organization (UNIDO)
 United Nations Mission for the Referendum in Western Sahara (MINURSO)
 United Nations Mission in Liberia (UNMIL)
 United Nations Mission in the Central African Republic and Chad (MINURCAT)
 United Nations Mission in the Sudan (UNMIS)
 United Nations Observer Mission in Georgia (UNOMIG)
 United Nations Operation in Cote d'Ivoire (UNOCI)
 United Nations Organization Mission in the Democratic Republic of the Congo (MONUC)
 Universal Postal Union (UPU)
 World Customs Organization (WCO)
 World Federation of Trade Unions (WFTU)
 World Health Organization (WHO)
 World Intellectual Property Organization (WIPO)
 World Meteorological Organization (WMO)
 World Tourism Organization (UNWTO)
 World Trade Organization (WTO)

Law and order in Nigeria 

Law of Nigeria
 Cannabis in Nigeria
 Constitution of Nigeria
 Crime in Nigeria
 Human rights in Nigeria
 LGBT rights in Nigeria
 Law enforcement in Nigeria

Military of Nigeria 

Military of Nigeria
 Command
 Commander-in-chief:
 Ministry of Defence of Nigeria
 Forces
 Army of Nigeria
 Navy of Nigeria
 Air Force of Nigeria
 Military history of Nigeria

Local government in Nigeria 

Local government in Nigeria
characteristic of local government in Nigeria

History of Nigeria

History by period 
Before 1500
1500 to 1800
Colonial era
First Nigerian Republic (1963 to 1966)
Second Nigerian Republic (1979 to 1983)
Third Nigerian Republic (1993)
Fourth Nigerian Republic (1999 to present)

History of Nigeria by region 
History of Northern Nigeria

History of Nigeria by subject 
 Economic history of Nigeria
 Military history of Nigeria

Culture of Nigeria 

Culture of Nigeria
 Architecture of Nigeria
 Chieftaincy of Nigeria
 Cuisine of Nigeria
 Festivals in Nigeria
 Languages of Nigeria
 Media in Nigeria
 Museums in Nigeria
 National symbols of Nigeria
 Coat of arms of Nigeria
 Flag of Nigeria
 National anthem of Nigeria
 People of Nigeria
 Prostitution in Nigeria
 Public holidays in Nigeria
 Religion in Nigeria
 Christianity in Nigeria
 Hinduism in Nigeria
 Islam in Nigeria
 World Heritage Sites in Nigeria

Art in Nigeria 
 Cinema of Nigeria
 Literature of Nigeria
 Music of Nigeria
 Video gaming in Nigeria

Sports in Nigeria 

Sports in Nigeria
 Football in Nigeria
 Nigeria at the Olympics

Economy and infrastructure of Nigeria 

Economy of Nigeria
 Economic rank, by nominal GDP (2007): 41st (forty-first)
 Agriculture in Nigeria
 Banking in Nigeria
 Communications in Nigeria
 Internet in Nigeria
 Companies of Nigeria
 Currency of Nigeria: Naira
 ISO 4217: NGN
 Economic history of Nigeria
 Energy in Nigeria
 Oil industry in Nigeria
 Health care in Nigeria
 Mining in Nigeria
 Nigeria Stock Exchange
 Tourism in Nigeria
 Transport in Nigeria
 Airports in Nigeria
 Rail transport in Nigeria
 Water supply and sanitation in Nigeria

Education in Nigeria 

Education in Nigeria

See also 

 Index of Nigeria-related articles
 List of international rankings
 List of Nigeria-related topics
 Member state of the Commonwealth of Nations
 Member state of the United Nations
 Outline of Africa
 Outline of geography

References 
This the problem that arise from the large land mass of Nigeria

External links 

 Government

 Constitution of the Federal Republic of Nigeria - 1999
 Interactive Map of Nigeria

 News
 Vanguard daily newspaper
 This Day daily newspaper

Nigeria